Jay Gregory M. Bird (born 6 May 2001) is an English professional footballer who plays as a forward for National League club Dagenham & Redbridge.

Club career

Milton Keynes Dons
Born in Milton Keynes, Bird joined the academy of Milton Keynes Dons at the age of eight, and progressed through several age groups before signing professional terms with the club on 25 June 2019. In August 2019 he joined Southern Premier Central club Hitchin Town on loan for the 2019–20 campaign, but after only two matches a serious injury resulted in Bird being ruled out for the rest of the season.

On 6 October 2020, Bird made his first team professional debut for the club, scoring twice in a 3–2 EFL Trophy group stage away victory over Stevenage. The following 2021–22 season saw limited first team opportunities for Bird, with the player spending the first half of the season out on loan to National League club Wealdstone. At the end of the season Bird was one of six players released by MK Dons.

Dagenham & Redbridge
On 19 November 2022, Bird signed for National League club Dagenham & Redbridge on a non-contract basis. Bird made his debut that same day off the bench, scoring a late winner as his new side defeated Scunthorpe United.

Career statistics

References

2001 births
Living people
English footballers
People from Milton Keynes
Association football forwards
Milton Keynes Dons F.C. players
Hitchin Town F.C. players
Wealdstone F.C. players
Dagenham & Redbridge F.C. players
English Football League players
Southern Football League players
National League (English football) players